The 45th General Assembly of Nova Scotia represented Nova Scotia between February 24, 1954, and September 10, 1956.

Division of seats

There were 37 members of the General Assembly, elected in the 1953 Nova Scotia general election.

List of members

Former members of the 45th General Assembly

References 

Terms of the General Assembly of Nova Scotia
1953 establishments in Nova Scotia
1956 disestablishments in Nova Scotia
20th century in Nova Scotia